Urban agriculture, urban farming, or urban gardening is the practice of cultivating, processing, and distributing food in or around urban areas. It encompasses a complex and diverse mix of food production activities, including fisheries and forestry, in cities in both developed and developing countries. The term also applies to urban area activities of animal husbandry, aquaculture, beekeeping, and horticulture. These activities occur in peri-urban areas as well, although peri-urban agriculture may have different characteristics.
  
Urban agriculture can reflect varying levels of economic and social development. It may be a social movement for sustainable communities, where organic growers, "foodies", and "locavores" form social networks founded on a shared ethos of nature and community holism. These networks can evolve when receiving formal institutional support, becoming integrated into local town planning as a "transition town" movement for sustainable urban development. For others, food security, nutrition, and income generation are key motivations for the practice. In both scenarios, more direct access to fresh vegetables, fruits, and meat products through urban agriculture can improve food security and food safety.

History
In Persia's semi-desert towns, oases were fed through aqueducts carrying mountain water to support intensive food production, nurtured by wastes from the communities. In Machu Picchu, water was conserved and reused as part of the stepped architecture of the city, and vegetable beds were designed to gather sun in order to prolong the growing season.

 The idea of supplemental food production beyond rural farming operations and distant imports is not new. It was used during war and depression times when food shortage issues arose, as well as during times of relative abundance. Allotment gardens emerged in Germany in the early 19th century as a response to poverty and food insecurity. 
In 1893, citizens of a depression-struck Detroit were asked to use vacant lots to grow vegetables. They were nicknamed Pingree's Potato Patches after the mayor, Hazen S. Pingree, who came up with the idea. He intended for these gardens to produce income, food supply, and boost independence during times of hardship. Victory gardens sprouted during WWI and WWII and were fruit, vegetable, and herb gardens in the US, Canada, and UK. This effort was undertaken by citizens to reduce pressure on food production that was to support the war effort.

During World War I, President Woodrow Wilson called upon all American citizens to utilize any available open food growth, seeing this as a way to pull them out of a potentially damaging situation. Since most of Europe was consumed with war, they were unable to produce sufficient food supplies to be shipped to the US and a new plan was implemented with the goal of feeding the US and even supply a surplus to other countries in need. By 1919, over 5 million plots were growing food and over 500 million pounds of produce was harvested.

A very similar practice came into use during the Great Depression that provided a purpose, job and food to those who would otherwise be without anything during such harsh times. These efforts helped raise spirits and boost economic growth. Over 2.8 million dollars worth of food was produced from the subsistence gardens during the Depression. By World War II, the War/Food Administration set up a National Victory Garden Program that set out to systematically establish functioning agriculture within cities. With this new plan in action, as many as 5.5 million Americans took part in the victory garden movement and over nine million pounds of fruit and vegetables were grown a year, accounting for 44% of US-grown produce throughout that time.

Main types

There is no overarching term for agricultural plots in urban areas.  Gardens and farms, while not easy to define, are the two main types. According to the USDA, a farm is "any place from which $1,000 or more of agricultural products were produced and sold." In Europe, the term "city farm" is used to include gardens and farms.

Gardens 
Many communities make community gardening accessible to the public, providing space for citizens to cultivate plants for food, recreation and education. Community gardens give citizens the opportunity to learn about horticulture through trial and error and get a better understanding of the process of producing food and other plants. A community gardening program that is well-established is Seattle's P-Patch. The grassroots permaculture movement has been hugely influential in the renaissance of urban agriculture throughout the world. During the 1960s a number of community gardens were established in the United Kingdom, influenced by the community garden movement in the United States. Bristol's Severn Project was established in 2010 for £2500 and provides 34 tons of produce per year, employing people from disadvantaged backgrounds.

Farms 

City farms are agricultural plots in urban areas, that have people working with animals and plants to produce food. They are usually community-run gardens seeking to improve community relationships and offer an awareness of agriculture and farming to people who live in urbanized areas. They are important sources of food security for many communities around the globe. City farms vary in size from small plots in private yards to larger farms that occupy a number of acres. In 1996, a United Nations report estimated there are over 800 million people worldwide who grow food and raise livestock in cities.  Although some city farms have paid employees, most rely heavily on volunteer labour, and some are run by volunteers alone. Other city farms operate as partnerships with local authorities.

An early city farm was set up in 1972 in Kentish Town, London. It combines farm animals with gardening space, an addition inspired by children's farms in the Netherlands. Other city farms followed across London and the United Kingdom. In Australia, several city farms exist in various capital cities. In Melbourne, the Collingwood Children's Farm was established in 1979 on the Abbotsford Precinct Heritage Farmlands (the APHF), the oldest continually farmed land in Victoria, farmed since 1838.

In 2010, New York City saw the building and opening of the world's largest privately owned and operated rooftop farm, followed by an even larger location in 2012. Both were a result of municipal programs such as The Green Roof Tax Abatement Program and Green Infrastructure Grant Program.

In Singapore, hydroponic rooftop farms (which also rely on vertical farming) are appearing. The goal behind these is to rejuvenate areas and workforces that have thus far been marginalized. Simultaneously top level pesticide-free produce will be grown and harvested.

Perspectives

Resource and economic
The Urban Agriculture Network has defined urban agriculture as:

An industry that produces, processes, and markets food, fuel, and other outputs, largely 
in response to the daily demand of consumers within a town, city, or metropolis, many types of privately and publicly held land and water bodies were found throughout intra-urban and 
peri-urban areas. Typically urban agriculture applies intensive production methods, frequently using and reusing natural resources and urban wastes, to yield a diverse array of land-, water-, and air-based fauna and flora contributing to food security, health, livelihood, and environment of the individual, household, and community.

With rising urbanization, food resources in urban areas are less accessible than in rural areas. This disproportionately affects the poorest communities, and the lack of food access and increased risk of malnutrition has been linked to socioeconomic inequities. Economic barriers to food access are linked to capitalist market structures and lead to "socioeconomic inequities in food choices", "less... healthful foods", and phenomena such as food deserts. Additionally, racialized systems of governance of urban poor communities facilitates the increasing prominence of issues such as unemployment, poverty, access to health, educational and social resources, including a community's access to healthy food.

Today, some cities have much vacant land due to urban sprawl and home foreclosures. This land could be used to address food insecurity. One study of Cleveland shows that the city could actually meet up to 100% of its fresh produce need. This would prevent up to $115 million in annual economic leakage. Using the rooftop space of New York City would also be able to provide roughly twice the amount of space necessary to supply New York City with its green vegetable yields. Space could be even better optimized through the usage of hydroponic or indoor factory production of food. Growing gardens within cities would also cut down on the amount of food waste. In order to fund these projects, it would require financial capital in the form of private enterprises or government funding.

Environmental

The Council for Agricultural Science and Technology (CAST) defines urban agriculture to include aspects of environmental health, remediation, and recreation:

Urban agriculture is a complex system encompassing a spectrum of interests, from a traditional core of activities associated with the production, processing, marketing, distribution, and consumption, to a multiplicity of other benefits and services that are less widely acknowledged and documented. These include recreation and leisure; economic vitality and business entrepreneurship, individual health and well-being; community health and well being; landscape beautification; and environmental restoration and remediation.

Modern planning and design initiatives are often more responsive to this model of urban agriculture because it fits within the current scope of sustainable design. The definition allows for a multitude of interpretations across cultures and time. Frequently it is tied to policy decisions to build sustainable cities.

Urban farms also provide unique opportunities for individuals, especially those living in cities, to get actively involved with ecological citizenship. By reconnecting with food production and nature, urban community gardening teaches individuals the skills necessary to participate in a democratic society. Decisions must be made on a group-level basis in order to run the farm. Most effective results are achieved when residents of a community are asked to take on more active roles in the farm.

Food security

Access to nutritious food, both economically and geographically, is another perspective in the effort to locate food and livestock production in cities. The tremendous influx of the world population to urban areas has increased the need for fresh and safe food. The Community Food Security Coalition (CFSC) defines food security as:

All persons in a community having access to culturally acceptable, nutritionally adequate food through local, non-emergency sources at all times.

Areas faced with food security issues have limited choices, often relying on highly processed fast food or convenience store foods that are high in calories and low in nutrients, which may lead to elevated rates of diet-related illnesses such as diabetes. These problems have brought about the concept of food justice which Alkon and Norgaard (2009; 289) explain that, "places access to healthy, affordable, culturally appropriate food in the contexts of institutional racism, racial formation, and racialized geographies... Food justice serves as a theoretical and political bridge between scholarship and activism on sustainable agriculture, food insecurity, and environmental justice."

Some systematic reviews have already explored urban agriculture contribution to food security and other determinants of health outcomes (see )

Urban agriculture is part of a larger discussion of the need for alternative agricultural paradigms to address food insecurity, inaccessibility of fresh foods, and unjust practices on multiple levels of the food system; and this discussion has been led by different actors, including food-insecure individuals, farm workers, educators and academics, policymakers, social movements, organizations, and marginalized people globally.

The issue of food security is accompanied by the related movements of food justice and food sovereignty. These movements incorporate urban agriculture in how they address food-resources of a community. Food sovereignty, in addition to promoting food access, also seeks to address the power dynamics and political economy of food; it accounts for the embedded power structures of the food system, ownership of production, and decision-making on multiple levels (i.e. growing, processing, and distribution): Under this framework, representative decision-making and responsiveness to the community are core features.

Agroecological 

Agroecology is a scientific framework, movement, and applied practice of agricultural management systems that seeks to achieve food sovereignty within food systems and prioritizes sustainability, farmer and consumer well-being, traditional knowledge revival, and democratized learning systems. Transdisciplinarity and diversity of knowledge is a central theme to agroecology, so many urban agroecology initiatives address topics of social justice, gender empowerment, ecological sustainability, indigenous sovereignty, and participation in addition to promoting food access.

Under an agroecological framework, urban agriculture has the potential to play a role as a "public space, as an economic development strategy, and as a community-organizing tool" while alleviating food insecurity.

Impact
In general, Urban and peri urban agriculture (UPA) contributes to food availability, particularly of fresh produce, provides employment and income and can contribute to the food security and nutrition of urban dwellers.

Economic
Urban and Peri-urban agriculture (UPA) expands the economic base of the city through production, processing, packaging, and marketing of consumable products. This results in an increase in entrepreneurial activities and the creation of jobs, as well as reducing food costs and improving quality. UPA provides employment, income, and access to food for urban populations, which helps to relieve chronic and emergency food insecurity. Chronic food insecurity refers to less affordable food and growing urban poverty, while emergency food insecurity relates to breakdowns in the chain of food distribution. UPA plays an important role in making food more affordable and in providing emergency supplies of food. Research into market values for produce grown in urban gardens has been attributed to a community garden plot a median yield value of between approximately $200 and $500 (US, adjusted for inflation).

Social

Urban agriculture can have a large impact on the social and emotional well-being of individuals. UA can have an overall positive impact on community health, which directly impacts individuals social and emotional well-being. Urban gardens are often places that facilitate positive social interaction, which also contributes to overall social and emotional well-being. Many gardens facilitate the improvement of social networks within the communities that they are located. For many neighborhoods, gardens provide a "symbolic focus", which leads to increased neighborhood pride. Urban agriculture increases community participation through diagnostic workshops or different commissions in the area of vegetable gardens. Activities which involve hundreds of people.

When individuals come together around UA, physical activity levels are often increased.  This can also raise serotonin levels akin to working out at a gym. There is the added element of walking/biking to the gardens, further increasing physical activity and the benefits of being outdoors.

UPA can be seen as a means of improving the livelihood of people living in and around cities. Taking part in such practices is seen mostly as an informal activity, but in many cities where inadequate, unreliable, and irregular access to food is a recurring problem, urban agriculture has been a positive response to tackling food concerns. Due to the food security that comes with UA, feelings of independence and empowerment often arise. The ability to produce and grow food for oneself has also been reported to improve levels of self-esteem or of self-efficacy. Households and small communities take advantage of vacant land and contribute not only to their household food needs but also the needs of their resident city. The CFSC states that:

Community and residential gardening, as well as small-scale farming, save household food dollars. They promote nutrition and free cash for non-garden foods and other items. As an example, you can raise your own chickens on an urban farm and have fresh eggs for only $0.44 per dozen.

This allows families to generate larger incomes selling to local grocers or to local outdoor markets while supplying their household with the proper nutrition of fresh and nutritional products.

Some community urban farms can be quite efficient and help women find work, who in some cases are marginalized from finding employment in the formal economy. Studies have shown that participation from women have a higher production rate, therefore producing the adequate amount for household consumption while supplying more for market sale.

As most UA activities are conducted on vacant municipal land, there have been raising concerns about the allocation of land and property rights. The IDRC and the FAO have published the Guidelines for Municipal Policymaking on Urban Agriculture, and are working with municipal governments to create successful policy measures that can be incorporated in urban planning.

Over a third of US households, roughly 42 million, participate in food gardening.  There has also been an increase of 63% participation in farming by millennials from 2008-2013. US households participating in community gardening has also tripled from 1 to 3 million in that time frame. Urban agriculture provides unique opportunities to bridge diverse communities together. In addition, it provides opportunities for health care providers to interact with their patients. Thus, making each community garden a hub that is reflective of the community.

Energy efficiency

The current industrial agriculture system is accountable for high energy costs for the transportation of foodstuffs. According to a study by Rich Pirog, associate director of the Leopold Center for Sustainable Agriculture at Iowa State University, the average conventional produce item travels , using, if shipped by tractor-trailer,  of fossil fuel per . The energy used to transport food is decreased when urban agriculture can provide cities with locally grown food. Pirog found that traditional, non-local, food distribution system used 4 to 17 times more fuel and emitted 5 to 17 times more  than the local and regional transport.

Carbon footprint
As mentioned above, the energy-efficient nature of urban agriculture can reduce each city's carbon footprint by reducing the amount of transport that occurs to deliver goods to the consumer. Such areas can act as carbon sinks offsetting some of the carbon accumulation that is innate to urban areas, where pavement and buildings outnumber plants. Plants absorb atmospheric carbon dioxide and release breathable oxygen (O2) through photosynthesis. The process of Carbon Sequestration can be further improved by combining other agriculture techniques to increase removal from the atmosphere and prevent the release of  during harvest time. However, this process relies heavily on the types of plants selected and the methodology of farming. Specifically, choosing plants that do not lose their leaves and remain green all year can increase the farm's ability to sequester carbon.

Reduction in ozone and particulate matter
The reduction in ozone and other particulate matter can benefit human health.  Reducing these particulates and ozone gases could reduce mortality rates in urban areas along with increase the health of those living in cities. 
A 2011 article found that a rooftop containing 2000 m2 of uncut grass has the potential to remove up to 4000 kg of particulate matter and that one square meter of green roof is sufficient to offset the annual particulate matter emissions of a car.

Soil decontamination
Vacant urban lots are often victims to illegal dumping of hazardous chemicals and other wastes. They are also liable to accumulate standing water and "grey water", which can be dangerous to public health, especially left stagnant for long periods. The implementation of urban agriculture in these vacant lots can be a cost-effective method for removing these chemicals. In the process known as Phytoremediation, plants and the associated microorganisms are selected for their chemical ability to degrade, absorb, convert to an inert form, and remove toxins from the soil.  Several chemicals can be targeted for removal, including heavy metals (e.g. Mercury and lead), inorganic compounds (e.g. Arsenic and Uranium), and organic compounds (e.g. petroleum and chlorinated compounds like PBCs).

Phytoremeditation is both an environmentally-friendly, cost-effective and energy-efficient measure to reduce pollution. Phytoremediation only costs about $5–$40 per ton of soil being decontaminated. Implementation of this process also reduces the amount of soil that must be disposed of in a hazardous waste landfill.

Urban agriculture as a method to mediate chemical pollution can be effective in preventing the spread of these chemicals into the surrounding environment. Other methods of remediation often disturb the soil and force the chemicals contained within it into the air or water. Plants can be used as a method to remove chemicals and also to hold the soil and prevent erosion of contaminated soil decreasing the spread of pollutants and the hazard presented by these lots.

One way of identifying soil contamination is through using already well-established plants as bioindicators of soil health. Using well-studied plants is important because there has already been substantial bodies of work to test them in various conditions, so responses can be verified with certainty. Such plants are also valuable because they are genetically identical as crops as opposed to natural variants of the same species. Typically urban soil has had the topsoil stripped away and has led to soil with low aeration, porosity, and drainage. Typical measures of soil health are microbial biomass and activity, enzymes, soil organic matter (SOM), total nitrogen, available nutrients, porosity, aggregate stability, and compaction. A new measurement is active carbon (AC), which is the most usable portion of the total organic carbon (TOC) in the soil. This contributes greatly to the functionality of the soil food web. Using common crops, which are generally well-studied, as bioindicators can be used to effectively test the quality of an urban farming plot before beginning planting.

Noise pollution
Large amounts of noise pollution not only lead to lower property values and high frustration, they can be damaging to human hearing and health. The study "Noise exposure and public health" found that exposure to continual noise is a public health problem. Examples of the detriment of continual noise on humans to include: "hearing impairment, hypertension and ischemic heart disease, annoyance, sleep disturbance, and decreased school performance." Since most roofs or vacant lots consist of hard flat surfaces that reflect sound waves instead of absorbing them, adding plants that can absorb these waves has the potential to lead to a vast reduction in noise pollution.

Nutrition and quality of food
Daily intake of a variety of fruits and vegetables is linked to a decreased risk of chronic diseases including diabetes, heart disease, and cancer. Urban agriculture is associated with increased consumption of fruits and vegetables which decreases risk for disease and can be a cost-effective way to provide citizens with quality, fresh produce in urban settings.

Produce from urban gardens can be perceived to be more flavorful and desirable than store bought produce which may also lead to a wider acceptance and higher intake. A Flint, Michigan study found that those participating in community gardens consumed fruits and vegetables 1.4 times more per day and were 3.5 times more likely to consume fruits or vegetables at least 5 times daily (p. 1).  Garden-based education can also yield nutritional benefits in children. An Idaho study reported a positive association between school gardens and increased intake of fruit, vegetables, vitamin A, vitamin C and fiber among sixth graders. Harvesting fruits and vegetables initiates the enzymatic process of nutrient degradation which is especially detrimental to water soluble vitamins such as ascorbic acid and thiamin. The process of blanching produce in order to freeze or can reduce nutrient content slightly, but not nearly as much as the amount of time spent in storage. Harvesting produce from one's own community garden cuts back on storage times significantly.

Urban agriculture also provides quality nutrition for low-income households. Studies show that every $1 invested in a community garden yields $6 worth of vegetables if labor is not considered a factor in investment. Many urban gardens reduce the strain on food banks and other emergency food providers by donating shares of their harvest and providing fresh produce in areas that otherwise might be food deserts. The supplemental nutrition program Women, Infants and Children (WIC) as well as the Supplemental Nutrition Assistance Program (SNAP) have partnered with several urban gardens nationwide to improve the accessibility to produce in exchange for a few hours of volunteer gardening work.

Urban farming has been shown to increase health outcomes. Gardeners consume twice as much fruit and vegetables than non-gardeners. Levels of physical activity are also positively associated with urban farming. These results are seen indirectly and can be supported by the social involvement in an individual's community as a member of the community farm. This social involvement helped raise the aesthetic appeal of the neighborhood, boosting the motivation or efficacy of the community as a whole. This increased efficacy was shown to increase neighborhood attachment. Therefore, the positive health outcomes of urban farming can be explained in part by interpersonal and social factors that boost health. Focusing on improving the aesthetics and community relationships and not only on the plant yield, is the best way to maximize the positive effect of urban farms on a neighborhood.

Economy of scale
Using high-density urban farming  with vertical farms or stacked greenhouses, many environmental benefits can be achieved on a citywide scale that would be impossible otherwise. These systems do not only provide food, but also produce potable water from waste water, and can recycle organic waste back to energy and nutrients. At the same time, they can reduce food-related transportation to a minimum while providing fresh food for large communities in almost any climate.

Health inequalities and food justice
A 2009 report by the USDA determined that "evidence is both abundant and robust enough for us to conclude that Americans living in low-income and minority areas tend to have poor access to healthy food", and that the "structural inequalities" in these neighborhoods "contribute to inequalities in diet and diet-related outcomes".  These diet-related outcomes, including obesity and diabetes, have become epidemic in low-income urban environments in the United States. Although the definition and methods for determining "food deserts" have varied, studies indicate that, at least in the United States,  there are racial disparities in the food environment. Thus using the definition of environment as the place where people live, work, play and pray, food disparities become an issue of environmental justice. This is especially true in American inner-cities where a history of racist practices have contributed to the development of food deserts in the low-income, minority areas of the urban core. The issue of inequality is so integral to the issues of food access and health that the Growing Food & Justice for All Initiative was founded with the mission of "dismantling racism" as an integral part of creating food security.

Not only can urban agriculture provide healthy, fresh food options, but also can contribute to a sense of community, aesthetic improvement, crime reduction, minority empowerment and autonomy, and even preserve culture through the use of farming methods and heirloom seeds preserved from areas of origin.

Environmental justice
Urban agriculture may advance environmental justice and food justice for communities living in food deserts.  First, urban agriculture may reduce racial and class disparities in access to healthy food. When urban agriculture leads to locally grown fresh produce sold at affordable prices in food deserts, access to healthy food is not just available for those who live in wealthy areas, thereby leading to greater equity in rich and poor neighborhoods.
 
Improved access to food through urban agriculture can also help alleviate psychosocial stresses in poor communities. Community members engaged in urban agriculture improve local knowledge about healthy ways to fulfill dietary needs. Urban agriculture can also better the mental health of community members. Buying and selling quality products to local producers and consumers allows community members to support one another, which may reduce stress. Thus, urban agriculture can help improve conditions in poor communities, where residents experience higher levels of stress due to a perceived lack of control over the quality of their lives.
 
Urban agriculture may improve the livability and built environment in communities that lack supermarkets and other infrastructure due to the presence of high unemployment caused by deindustrialization. Urban farmers who follow sustainable agricultural methods can not only help to build local food system infrastructure, but can also contribute to improving local air, and water and soil quality. Urban farming serves as one type of green space in urban areas, it has a positive impact on the air quality in the surrounding area. A case study conducted on a rooftop farm shows the PM2.5 concentration in the urban farming area is 7-33% lower than the surrounding parts without green spaces in a city. When agricultural products are produced locally within the community, they do not need to be transported, which reduces  emission rates and other pollutants that contribute to high rates of asthma in lower socioeconomic areas. Sustainable urban agriculture can also promote worker protection and consumer rights. For example, communities in New York City, Illinois, and Richmond, Virginia, have demonstrated improvements to their local environments through urban agricultural practices.
 
However, urban agriculture can also present urban growers with health risks if the soil used for urban farming is contaminated. Lead contamination is particularly common, with hazardous levels of lead found in soil in many United States cities. High lead levels in soil originate from sources including flaking lead paint which was widely used before being banned in the 1970s, vehicle exhaust, and atmospheric deposition. Without proper education on the risks of urban farming and safe practices, urban consumers of urban agricultural produce may face additional health-related issues.

Implementation

Creating a community-based infrastructure for urban agriculture means establishing local systems to grow and process food and transfer it from farmer to consumer.

To facilitate food production, cities have established community-based farming projects. Some projects have collectively tended community farms on common land, much like that of the eighteenth-century Boston Common. One such community farm is the Collingwood Children's Farm in Melbourne, Australia. Other community garden projects use the allotment garden model, in which gardeners care for individual plots in a larger gardening area, often sharing a tool shed and other amenities. Seattle's P-Patch Gardens use this model, as did the South Central Farm in Los Angeles and the Food Roof Farm in St. Louis. Independent urban gardeners also grow food in individual yards and on roofs. Garden sharing projects seek to pair producers with the land, typically, residential yard space. Roof gardens allow for urban dwellers to maintain green spaces in the city without having to set aside a tract of undeveloped land. Rooftop farms allow otherwise unused industrial roofspace to be used productively, creating work and profit. Projects around the world seek to enable cities to become 'continuous productive landscapes' by cultivating vacant urban land and temporary or permanent kitchen gardens.

 
Food processing on a community level has been accommodated by centralizing resources in community tool sheds and processing facilities for farmers to share. The Garden Resource Program Collaborative based in Detroit has cluster tool banks. Different areas of the city have tool banks where resources like tools, compost, mulch, tomato stakes, seeds, and education can be shared and distributed with the gardeners in that cluster. Detroit's Garden Resource Program Collaborative also strengthens their gardening community by providing access to their member's transplants; education on gardening, policy, and food issues; and by building connectivity between gardeners through workgroups, potlucks, tours, field trips, and cluster workdays. In Brazil, "Cities Without Hunger" has generated a public policy for the reconstruction of abandoned areas with food production and has improved the green areas of the community.

Farmers' markets, such as the farmers' market in Los Angeles, provide a common land where farmers can sell their product to consumers. Large cities tend to open their farmer's markets on the weekends and one day in the middle of the week. For example, the farmers' market of Boulevard Richard-Lenoir in Paris, France, is open on Sundays and Thursdays. However, to create a consumer dependency on urban agriculture and to introduce local food production as a sustainable career for farmers, markets would have to be open regularly. For example, the Los Angeles Farmers' Market is open seven days a week and has linked several local grocers together to provide different food products. The market's central location in downtown Los Angeles provides the perfect interaction for a diverse group of sellers to access their consumers.

Argentina
The city of Rosario (population: 1.3 million) has incorporated agriculture fully into its land-use planning and urban development strategy. Its Land Use Plan 2007-2017 makes specific provision for the agricultural use of public land. Under its Metropolitan Strategic Plan 2008-2018, Rosario is building a "green circuit", passing through and around the city, consisting of family and community gardens, large-scale, commercial vegetable gardens and orchards, multifunctional garden parks, and "productive barrios", where agriculture is integrated into programs for the construction of public housing and the upgrading of slums. In 2014, the green circuit consisted of more than 30 ha of land used to grow vegetables, fruit, and medicinal and aromatic plants. The city has five garden parks – large, landscaped green areas covering a total of 72 ha of land, which is used for agriculture and for cultural, sports and educational activities.

Australia
Various studies argue that the increased usage of urban agricultural practices in Australian cities could profoundly mitigate the consequences of climate change and promote food security. In one 2020 study, the authors demonstrated that using 25% of vacant land and yard space in Sydney for urban agriculture practices could boost food supply by up to 15%.

In light of these benefits, urban agriculture is growing more common in Australia, particularly in the form of urban farms and roadside gardens. In some cities, local councils have even encouraged urban agriculture by providing residents with guidelines to support roadside gardens. In others, however, planning policies and regulations have impeded access to sufficient and suitable land for urban agriculture. Regardless, insufficient suitable land has been a major obstacle to the spread of the practice in Australian cities.

In Queensland many people have started a trend of urban farming and utilizing aquaponics and self-watering containers.

Canada

British Columbia
A Canadian urban farmer in British Columbia has published details on a crop value rating (CVR) system that urban farmers can use to determine which crops to grow, based on each crop's contribution to supporting the farm economically. This entails forgoing some crops in favor of others, but he points out that urban farmers can develop business networking with rural farmers to bring some of those other crops to the urban point of sale. For example, the urban farmer may not be able to economically justify growing sweet corn (based on long days to maturity and low yield density per linear foot of row), but a networking arrangement is mutually beneficial, as it lets a rural sweet corn grower gain an additional point of sale at retail price while also letting the urban farmer fill the gap in his product line offering.

Several community projects in Victoria, British Columbia were born to promote urban agricultural practices such as the Sharing Backyards program. This program exists to help people living in urban areas get connected with others who have extra space in their yards for the purpose of urban farming. Organizations also exist to educate people living in the urban parts of Vancouver on farming and growing food in an urban setting by running public demonstration gardens.

Covering the roof of the west building of the Vancouver Convention Centre is the largest green roof in Canada and one of the 10 largest green roofs in the world. With around six acres of living space, it is home to more than 400,000 indigenous plants and grasses that provide insulation. It is also home to four Western honey bee beehives which pollinate the plants on the roof and provide honey. The living includes other sustainable practices such as recycling and reusing water.

The city of Kamloops, British Columbia, actively promotes urban agricultural practices within their community. They stress the importance of food security and its effect on the economy as well as the ecology. They created the Food and Urban Agriculture Plan (FUAP), initiated in 2014, which lays out goals and strategies to implement a sustainable food system. The Areas which they cover include: Food Production and Land Availability, Food Processing and Preparing, Food Distribution/Retail/Access, Cooking/Eating and Celebrating Food, Food Waste and Resource Management, as well as Education/Governance and Capacity Building. The FUAP greatly emphasizes on Urban Agriculture.

Ontario
Ontario is the second biggest province and is one of the most urbanized in Canada. The provincial government of Ontario has a website dedicated to providing information to those who are interested in establishing an urban farm or for those who just want to learn more about urban agriculture in Ontario.

The City of Ottawa is home to the largest urban farm in the nation, the Central Experimental Farm (CEF). Centrally located and surrounded by the city, the 4 square kilometres (1.5 sq mi) farm is an agricultural facility, working farm, and research center of Agriculture and Agri-Food Canada. The City of Ottawa is also home to numerous urban farms within the 203.5-square-kilometre (78.6 sq mi) greenbelt.

Along with many other cities in Ontario, the City of Toronto allows eligible residents in 4 wards across the city to keep a maximum of 4 hens (no roosters) for the purpose of enjoyment or personal consumption of only the eggs. There are other requirements included with rearing these hens under this program such as zoning and guidelines for building the enclosure, waste and disposal. The wards eligible for this program from the UrbanHensTo site include Ward 13 (Parkdale-High Park), Ward 21 (St. Paul's), Ward 5 (Etobicoke-Lakeshore), and Ward 32 (Beaches-East York). Workshops are also available to those interested in rearing urban hens. However, failure to abide by these rules and regulations can result in fines.

Quebec

In Montreal, about 100 community gardens provide plots where citizens can grow fruits, vegetables, herbs, and flowers. The largest community garden has about 255 allotment plots, while the smallest site has about 25 plots. Out of 2 million people living in the urbanized parts of Montreal, about 10,000 residents share the garden plots. The program has been in place since 1975 and is managed by the boroughs. Some of the boroughs have a gardening instructor who visits the gardens regularly to give gardeners tips. Soil, a water supply, a space for tools, sand, fencing, and paint are provided by the city, managed by the Department of Sports, Recreation and Social Development.

Canada has a number of companies working on urban farm technology, including in Montreal. The most significant is Lufa Farms, a private company that opened what is reported to be the world's largest rooftop greenhouse at 163,000 sq ft in the Montreal borough of Saint-Laurent.  This is Lufa's fourth rooftop greenhouse in Montreal and is built on the roof of the former Sears Canada warehouse.  Lufa's first rooftop greenhouse was built in early 2011, a 2880 sq metre (31,000 sq ft) hydroponic rooftop greenhouse atop a warehouse designated as their headquarters. They built two more large rooftop greenhouses in greater Montreal in 2013 (4,000 sq metre / 43,000 sq ft) and 2017 (5,850 sq metre / 63,000 sq ft), spending almost $10 million for the three structures. Also in 2017, an IGA supermarket in Saint-Laurent in Montreal unveiled a green roof of about 25,000 square feet of green space and products certified by Ecocert Canada. They state that they can provide over 30 different kinds of rooftop grown organic produce, along with honey produced and harvested from eight bee hives located on the roof.

Both Lufa and IGA rely on non-rooftop production for some of their produce. Only shallow-rooted plant can grow on roofs, eliminating crops such as potatoes and corn. Some local farmers point out that the industrial systems are subsidized and are unfair competition.

China
China has more than 1.4 billion people and more than 70% of them are going to live in urban areas in 2035. Despite the great economic success and other benefits brought by fast urbanization and industrialization development, Chinese urbanization has led to various problems such as the diminishing of cultivable land, lack of food security, and environmental destruction because of urban territory construction. Such "suburban agriculture" led to more than 70% of non-staple food in Beijing, mainly consisting of vegetables and milk, to be produced by the city itself in the 1960s and 1970s. Recently, with relative food security in China, periurban agriculture has led to improvements in the quality of the food available, as opposed to quantity. One of the more recent experiments in urban agriculture is the Modern Agricultural Science Demonstration Park in Xiaotangshan.

Traditionally, Chinese cities have been known to mix agricultural activities within the urban setting. Shenzhen, once a small farming community, is now a fast-growing metropolis due to the Chinese government's designation as an open economic zone. Due to the large and growing population in China, the government supports urban self-sufficiency in food production. Shenzhen's village structure, sustainable methods, and new agricultural advancements initiated by the government have been strategically configured to supply food for this growing city.

The first tier approached from the city center produces perishable items. Located just outside these farms, hardier vegetables are grown such as potatoes, carrots, and onions. This system allows producers to be sold in city markets just a few short hours after picking.

Another impressive method used in Chinese agriculture and aquaculture practice is the mulberry-dike fish-pond system, which is a response to waste recycling and soil fertility. This system can be described as:

Mulberry trees are grown to feed silkworms and the silkworm waste is fed to the fish in ponds. The fish also feed on waste from other animals, such as pigs, poultry, and buffalo. The animals, in turn, are given crops that have been fertilized by mud from the ponds. This is a sophisticated system as a continuous cycle of water, waste, and food... with a man built into the picture.

As the population grows and industry advances, the city tries to incorporate potential agricultural growth by experimenting with new agricultural methods. The Fong Lau Chee Experimental Farm in Dongguan, Guangdong has worked with new agricultural advancements in lychee production. This farm was established with aspirations of producing large quantities and high-quality lychees, by constantly monitoring sugar content and their seeds. This research, conducted by local agricultural universities allows for new methods to be used with hopes of reaching the needs of city consumers.

However, due to increased levels of economic growth and pollution, some urban farms have become threatened. The government has been trying to step in and create new technological advancements within the agricultural field to sustain levels of urban agriculture.

"The city plans to invest 8.82 billion yuan in 39 agricultural projects, including a safe agricultural base, an agricultural high-tech park, agricultural processing and distribution, forestry, eco-agricultural tourism, which will form urban agriculture with typical Shenzhen characteristics" in conjunction with this program, the city is expected to expand the Buji Farm Produce Wholesale Market.

According to the Municipal Bureau of Agriculture, Forestry and Fishery the city will invest 600 million yuan on farms located around the city, with hopes of the farms to provide "60 percent of the meat, vegetables, and aquatic products in the Shenzhen market".

There has also been an emerging trend of going green and organic as a response to pollution and pesticides used in farming practices. Vegetable suppliers are required to pass certain inspections held by the city's Agriculture Bureau before they can be sold as "green".

Cuba

After the disintegration of the Soviet Union and the Eastern Bloc, Cuba faced severe shortages of fuel and agrochemical inputs. These products had previously been imported from the Soviet Union in exchange for Cuban sugar. As a result, Cubans experienced an acute food crisis in the early 1990s, which in part was met with a popular movement of urban agriculture. Urban farmers employed – and still employ –agroecological techniques, allowing food production to take place largely without petroleum-based inputs.

In 2002,  of urban gardens produced  of food. In Havana, 90% of the city's fresh produce come from local urban farms and gardens. In 2003, more than 200,000 Cubans worked in the expanding urban agriculture sector.

Egypt
In Egypt, development of rooftop gardens began in the 1990s. In the early 1990s at Ain Shams University, a group of agriculture professors developed an initiative focused on growing organic vegetables to suit densely populated cities of Egypt. The initiative was applied on a small scale; until it was officially adopted in 2001, by the Food and Agriculture Organization (FAO).

France 
In 2014, Paris Mayor Anne Hidalgo promised to devote 100 hectares (247 acres) of Paris to green space, with 30 hectares specializing in urban agriculture. Over 60 urban farming organizations emerged in Paris in the following five years.

Reported to open spring 2020 in the 15th arrondissement of Paris, the world's largest rooftop farm of 14,000 m will sit atop the six-story building at Expo Porte de Versailles. The farm Paris-based innovative company Viparis  teamed up with French companies Agripolis, who specialize in farms on rooftops or flat surfaces, and research/ecosystem-recreating company Cultures en Villes to bring this project to reality. Agripolis plans to operate the farm while Cultures en Ville will plan special events. The farm hopes to produce 2000 pounds of fruits and vegetables each day in a season, with over 30 variations of plants. In addition to being the largest urban farm in the world, the rooftop garden will use 10% of the amount of water traditional gardens need. The goal of the farm is to provide food to southern Paris businesses and provide educational tours and collaborative exercises for companies.

Ghana 
Urban agriculture has been present in West African cities for decades. The practice of vegetable cultivation in Ghana began under European colonization. During the period between World War I and II, the colonial government usurped urban vegetable farms in order to feed the allied forces stationed in the country. Prior to 1972, government officials were largely hostile to the planting of indigenous crops. However, economic downturn and food shortages during the mid-1970s led to a major policy reversal, and Ghanaians across the country were encouraged to grow food of their own choosing.

Now, there are seven types of urban agriculture systems in Accra, and these practices been able to contribute not only to food security, but also sanitation, water management, and public health. Irrigated urban vegetable production is the most common agricultural activity within the city, which uses wastewater to irrigate crops. According to one study, this irrigation system necessitates "manual fetching or pumps", which allows plots to benefit from the nutrients remaining in the water, and supports Accra's sanitation system. In Accra, men are primarily responsible for the labors of urban farming.

India
Economic development in Mumbai brought a growth in population caused mainly by the migration of laborers from other regions of the country. The number of residents in the city increased more than twelve times in the last century. Greater Mumbai, formed by City Island and Salsette Island, is the largest city in India with a population of 16.4 million, according to data collected by the census of 2001. Mumbai is one of the densest cities in the world, 48,215 persons per km² and 16,082 per km² in suburban areas. In this scenario, urban agriculture seems unlikely to be put into practice since it must compete with real estate developers for the access and use of vacant lots. Alternative farming methods have emerged as a response to the scarcity of land, water, and economic resources employed in UPA.

Dr. Doshi's city garden methods are revolutionary for being appropriate to apply in reduced spaces as terraces and balconies, even on civil construction walls, and for not requiring big investments in capital or long hours of work. His farming practice is purely organic and is mainly directed to domestic consumption. His gardening tools are composed of materials available in the local environment: sugarcane waste, polyethylene bags, tires, containers and cylinders, and soil. The containers and bags (open at both ends) are filled with the sugarcane stalks, compost, and garden soil, which make possible the use of a minimal quantity of water is compared to open fields. Doshi states that solar energy can replace soil in cities. He also recommends the idea of chain planning, or growing plants in intervals and in small quantities rather than at once and in large amounts. The concept of city farming developed by Doshi consumes the entire household's organic waste. He subsequently makes the household self-sufficient in the provision of food:  of fruits and vegetables are produced daily for 300 days a year.

The main objectives of a pilot project at city farm at Rosary High School, Dockyard Road, were to promote economic support for street children, beautify the city landscape, supply locally produced organic food to urban dwellers (mainly those residing in slums), and to manage organic waste in a sustainable city. The project was conducted in the Rosary School, in Mumbai, with the participation of street children during 2004. The participants were trained in urban farming techniques. The farm produced vegetables, fruits, and flowers. The idea has spread the concept of a city farm to other schools in the city.

The Mumbai Port Trust (MBPT) central kitchen distributes food to approximately 3,000 employees daily, generating important amounts of organic disposal. A terrace garden created by the staff recycles 90% of this waste in the production of vegetables and fruits. Preeti Patil, who is the catering officer at the MBPT explains the purpose of the enterprise:

The activity of city farming was started initially to dispose of kitchen organic waste in an eco-friendly way. Staff members, after their daily work in the kitchen, tend the garden, which has about 150 plants.

New Zealand 

An urban farm called Kaicycle in the capital city Wellington was established in 2015. It started as a way of composting local food waste, food scraps are collected by bicycle. Their criteria includes organic waste of up to 60 litres per week from local households and business. Their purpose is "diverting food waste from landfill and recycling these nutrients back into local soils". They garden on their urban farm with the compost they make and invite volunteers to help regularly. They sell some of the produce which helps pay for the composting operations, they also share it with volunteers and donate to community food projects. In 2020 it joined a new network of composting hubs managed by the Sustainability Trust.

Singapore 
Since the city state currently only produces less than 10% of food requirements locally, the Singaporean government has actively backed starters of urban farms in the city state with grants. As part of Singapore's "30 by 30" plan to produce 30% of the island state's food locally by 2030, the Urban Redevelopment Authority has actively encouraged the growing of commercial crops on top of Singapore's iconic HDB buildings, as well as in skyscrapers. Singapore's urban farming segment had an estimated market value of 22 million Singapore dollars in 2019. The website of the Urban Redevelopment Authority gives some examples of Singapore's successes with urban farming: Some local examples featured include Sky Greens’ innovative 9-metre tall system that allows vegetables to grow outdoors and vertically; Sustenir Agriculture’s indoor Controlled Environment Agriculture (CEA) farm that enables it to control all aspects of the environment to optimise crop growth; and Apollo Aquaculture Group’s three-tier vertical recirculating aquaculture system that lets it grow pearl grouper, coral trout, and white shrimp indoors on multiple levels.

Taiwan 

In Matsu Islands, the local government established a vegetable farmland at the town center of Nangan.

Thailand
In early 2000, urban gardens were started under the direction of the NGO, Thailand Environment Institute (TEI), to help achieve the Bangkok Metropolitan Administrations (BMA) priority to "green" Thailand. With a population of 12 million and 39% of the land in the city vacant due to rapid expansion of the 1960s–80s Bangkok is a testbed for urban gardens centered on community involvement. The two urban gardens initiated by TEI are in Bangkok Noi and Bangkapi and the main tasks were stated as:
 Teach members of the communities the benefits of urban green space.
 Create the social framework to plan, implement, and maintain the urban green space.
 Create a process of a method to balance the needs of the community with the needs of the larger environmental concerns.

While the goals of the NGO are important in a global context, the community goals are being met through the work of forming the urban gardens themselves. In this sense, the creation, implementation, and maintenance of urban gardens are highly determined by the desires of the communities involved. However, the criteria by which TEI measured their success illustrates the scope of benefits to a community which practices urban agriculture. TEI's success indicators were:
 Establishing an Urban Green Plan
 Community Capacity Building
 Poverty Reduction
 Links with Government
 Developing a Model for Other Communities

United Kingdom
Todmorden is a town of 17,000 inhabitants in Yorkshire, United Kingdom with a successful urban agriculture model. The project, which began in 2008, has meant that food crops have been planted at forty locations throughout the town. The produce is all free, the work is done by volunteers, and passers-by and visitors are invited to pick and use the products. Some Todmorden plots have been permission plots while others have been examples of guerilla gardening. All are "propaganda gardens" promoting locals to consider growing local, to eat seasonal, to consider the provenance of their food, and to enjoy fresh. There are food plots in the street, in the health center car park, at the rail station, in the police station, in the cemetery, and in all the town's schools.

United States

Nationwide Survey Findings 
According to the USDA, a farm is defined as a location that produces and sells at least $1,000 worth of products. A study conducted on urban farms in 2012 surveyed over 315 farms identified as urban. Of those, over 32% were found in the Northeast, more than 26% in the South, 22% in the West, and less than 19% in the Midwest. The survey found that most urban farms in the United States are structured as either non-profit or solely owned. Urban farms typically use techniques that allow them to produce intensively on a small land. Mainly, these practices include raised beds, greenhouse, and container gardens. Of the products made, an overwhelming majority of urban farms focus on fresh vegetables, followed by herbs and flowers. If an urban farm focuses on animals, the primary animal is hens. Bees and sheep are the second most common urban farm animals.

Almost half of the urban farms that participated in the survey made a total gross sale adding to less than $10,000. The majority of these sales coming from farmer's markets, community-upported agriculture (CSA), and restaurants. Not even 5% of the urban farms could be considered according to total gross sales statistics. Most urban farms agree on the main challenges that they face; production costs, managing pests, managing weeds, and climate. They also see profitability, financing, and farm labor as big challenges of managing an urban farm.

New York
 New York City has become a laboratory for urban agriculture within the last decade. The City began to make significant strides in 2007 with the founding of the Mayor's Office of Food Policy, although urban agricultural initiatives are sponsored by other city agencies, too.  The City's Department of Environmental Protection, for example, offers a grant program for private property owners in combined sewer areas of New York City. The minimum requirement for grantees is to manage 1" of stormwater runoff from the contributing impervious area. Eligible projects to manage water runoff include green roofs, rooftop farms, and rainwater harvesting on private property in combined sewer areas. The grant program has allowed New York City to build some of the world's largest rooftop farms.

Urban agriculture is especially important in New York City as many low-income residents suffer from high rates of obesity and diabetes and limited sources of fresh produce. The City and local nonprofit groups have been providing land, training and financial encouragement, but the impetus in urban farming has really come from the farmers, who often volunteer when their regular workday is done. One NYC urban agriculture initiative targeted at low-income residents is the Farms at NYCHA project. The program is a city-partnership placed in 12 neighborhoods that is intended to expand access to healthy food, promote healthy public housing committees and to develop young leadership. Another program comes from Grow to Learn, which provides opportunities for public school students to learn through urban farming. The program has grown to over 800 gardens since 2010.

There are various types of agricultural systems in New York City. Two alternate means of growing are: rooftop gardens and hydroponic (soil-less) growing. The New York Times wrote an article about one of Manhattan's first gardens which incorporate both these techniques. Additionally, some urban gardeners have used empty lots to start a community or urban gardens. However, the soil must be tested for heavy contamination in city soil because of vehicle exhaust and remnants of old construction. Regardless, there are hundreds of urban gardens across New York City. Controlled environment agricultural systems are also becoming increasingly common. According to one study, controlled environment agriculture systems in New York City have increased access to produce for some low-income communities and have created green-sector job opportunities. Proponents of hydroponic systems in particular have argued that producers like Gotham Greens have allowed city residents access to high nutrient produce within hours of its harvest.

Lastly, the City also has a composting program, which is available to gardeners, farmers, and residents. One group, GreenThumb, provides free seedlings. Another program, the City Farms project operated by the nonprofit Just Food, offers courses on growing and selling food.

California
In response to the recession of 2008, a coalition of community-based organizations, farmers, and academic institutions in California's Pomona Valley formed the Pomona Valley Urban Agriculture Initiative.

After the passage of the North American Free Trade Agreement, cheap grain from the United States flooded Mexico, driving peasant farmers off of their land. Many immigrated to the Pomona Valley and found work in the construction industry. With the 2008 recession, the construction industry also suffered in the region. It is unlikely to regain its former strength because of severe water shortages in this desert region as well as ongoing weakness in the local economy. These immigrants were dry land organic farmers in their home country by default since they did not have access to pesticides and petroleum-based fertilizers. Now, they found themselves on the border of two counties: Los Angeles County with a population of 10 million and almost no farmland, and San Bernardino County which has the worst access to healthy food in the state. In both counties, there is a growing demand for locally grown organic produce. In response to these conditions, Uncommon Good, a community-based nonprofit organization that works with immigrant farmer families, convened a forum which became the Urban Farmers Association. The Urban Farmers Association is the first organization of its kind for poor immigrant farmers in the Pomona Valley. Its goal is to develop opportunities for its members to support themselves and their families through urban agriculture. With Uncommon Good, it is a founding member of the Pomona Valley Urban Agriculture Initiative (PVUAI). The PVUAI is working with local colleges and universities to expand upon a food assessment survey that was done in the City of Pomona.

Oakland

Urban agriculture in West Oakland has taken a radical form that can be traced back to community gardening initiatives starting in the 1970s in the cities of Berkeley and Oakland, and the city's African-American heritage. Oakland's manufacturing industry attracted new residents during WWII. To reduce racial tension, the Oakland Housing Authority established housing projects for blacks in West Oakland and whites in East Oakland. With exclusionary covenants and redlining by banks, development capital was kept out of West Oakland while the African-American population had limited opportunities to rent or buy housing outside West Oakland.

The Black Panther Party (BPP) played a role in seeding urban agricultural practices in West Oakland. One of its social programs aimed to improve the access to healthy food for the city's black population by providing breakfast in local schools, churches, and community centers. A small amount of this food came from small local gardens planted by BPP members. According to Prof. Nathan McClintock, "The Panthers used gardening as a coping mechanism and a means of supplementing their diets, as well as a means to strengthen community members engaged in the struggle against oppression." The People of Color Greening Network (PCGN) was created in the 1990s. The group planted in empty and vacant lots in West Oakland. In addition, schools around Alameda County began teaching basic gardening skills and food education. Other groups have carried on those legacies, such as People's Grocery and Planting Justice.

In 1998, the city of Oakland's Mayor's Office of Sustainability proposed a Sustainable Community Development Initiative towards sustainable development. Due to West Oakland's lack of access to nutritious and healthy food, other organizations including the PCGN and City Slicker Farms demanded the plan include strategies for creating a sustainable impact on the local food system. City Slicker Farms was founded in 2001 in response to the lack of access to fresh produce in West Oakland. Through land donations from local residents, a network of urban farms was created through the Community Market Farms Program, and in 2005 the organization established the Backyard Garden Program to aid West Oakland residents in growing their own food at home. This program now grows upwards of 30,000 lbs. of food each year.

In 2005, Mayor Jerry Brown signed the UN World Environment Day Urban Environmental Accords, pledging Oakland to become a more sustainable city by the year 2012. This gave rise to Oakland City Council Resolutions, such as No. 76980 and No. 80332 which helped develop a Food Policy Council. It has teamed up with the Health of Oakland's People & Environment (HOPE) Collaborative, which works to improve the health and wellness of Oakland's residents. In 2009 the Oakland Food Policy Council started to plan urban agriculture in Oakland.

Detroit  
Since 2010, urban farming has rapidly expanded in the city of Detroit. Once home to nearly 2 million people, the city of Detroit now has a population under 700,000.  The population loss resulted in many vacant lots and properties. In an attempt to obtain healthier foods and beautify the neighborhood, residents began to repurpose the land and create urban farms. Small community gardens grew into larger projects with numerous non-profits forming to address both the problems of food deserts and vacant properties.

Across American cities, some urban gardens and green initiatives have taken the form environmental gentrification. The garden and farming projects have been found to increase rent prices and attract wealthier residents, resulting in physical and cultural displacement, as well as demographic changes. However, Detroit is unique as many of the urban agricultural initiatives are led by people of color, utilize empty land and are more accessible to neighboring residents.

Michigan's Urban Farming Initiative (MUFI) is a non-profit organization using urban agriculture as a way to promote education and social justice and empower urban communities.  MUFI is based out of the North End of Detroit and has a roughly three acre campus.  Since 2011, MUFI has transformed the space with help from over 10,000 volunteers and grown over 50,000 pounds of produce. Currently, the organization is working to connect the MUFI farm with the community through subsidized products for local residents and the construction of a three-story community center.

Keep Growing Detroit (KGD), founded in 2013, seeks to create a food sovereign, self-sustainable Detroit with healthy communities and resilient local economies.  The organization consists of numerous programs such as the Garden Resource Program, which supports 1600 urban farms, and Grown in Detroit, which connects urban farmers with local markets and restaurants.  The organization is also partnered with several youth groups and has a seven-week summer apprentice program focused on farming, business, finance and leadership skills.  In 2019, KGD helped hundreds of new farmers secure land and educated them about the benefits of and keys to urban agriculture.

Hantz Woodlands, also known as Hantz Farms, is an urban tree farm located on the east side of Detroit. Hantz Woodlands is a project of the Hantz Group, headed by businessman and Detroit-native John Hantz. The project has cleared more than 2,000 vacant city-owned lots and has demolished blighted homes to make way for the hardwood tree farm. It is currently the largest urban tree farm in the US. So far, Hantz Woodlands has invested over 1 million dollars in the community and has planted 25,000 trees over 140 acres.  The initiative has been credited with raising home values by 482% and beautifying the surrounding neighborhood. However, controversy and skepticism still surrounds the Hantz Farms project. Critics argue years after acquiring acres of land from Detroit, Hantz could sell the property for development into high-end and commercial real-estate. This action would generate massive profits for the Hantz Group while hurting community cohesion and leaving no payoff for long-time residents.

The Greening of Detroit is an urban forestry program and non-profit partner in The Detroit Partnership. As of November 2020, the organization has planted over 130,000 trees throughout Detroit.  In addition to planting trees in the Detroit area, the Greening of Detroit engages in urban forestry education, job training, and other community programs. The organization is also involved in urban farming and currently oversees Lafayette Greens.  The green space, located in downtown Detroit, grows chemical-free fruits, vegetables, herbs and flowers for the public to enjoy.

More recently, the city of Detroit has started investing in urban green initiatives. In 2019, Mike Duggan, the mayor of Detroit, outlined plans to increase demolition of blighted properties in the city.  One proposed way to revitalize Detroit was through the creation of community gardens, green spaces, and urban orchards. Detroit's largest upcoming project is the Joe Louis Greenway (JLG), a 32-mile non-motorized loop which will stretch from the downtown Detroit Riverfront to Highland Park.  The trail is estimated to cost $50 million raising concerns from residents who feel the money could be better spent addressing the blight and unemployment in the city.  The leaders of the project argue the JLG will bring neighborhood stabilization and development resulting in affordable housing and jobs.  Scholars identify two potential trajectories for the project: green gentrification, where  "open space will move into private hands, rather than being dedicated to community or public use", or green reparations where "projects would be undertaken with a specific intent of achieving social equity". Detroit's public officials have the opportunity and power to steer JLG along either of the paths, only one of which benefits predominately minority communities and areas of historical disinvestment.

Illinois  
Urban farming initiatives across the State of Illinois, including Chicago, have been spearheaded by advocacy groups. In addition, HB3418 allows municipalities and counties across the state, including Chicago, to establish urban agriculture zones (UAZs), supported by financial incentives such as reduced water rates, utility fees, and property tax abatements. Furthermore, the USDA has implemented the Outreach and Technical Assistance for Socially Disadvantaged and Veteran Farmers and Ranchers Program (the 2501 Program) which was transferred from USDA's National Institute of Food and Agriculture. The primary purpose of the 2501 Program is to enhance the coordination of outreach, technical assistance, and education efforts, to reach socially disadvantaged and veteran farmers, ranchers, and forest landowners and to improve their participation in the full range of USDA programs.

Zimbabwe
Harare is particularly suited for urban agriculture, as its topography heavily features vleis, land drainage systems that become waterlogged in the rainy season. When it rains they are difficult to cross, and in the dry season they shrink and crack, which causes structural damage to infrastructure, even though the vleis are still storing water underground. Therefore, these moisture-rich areas are mostly left unbuilt, allowing for urban cultivation.

Aside from vleis and the private residential land that Harareans cultivate, considerable public land is used for agriculture in Harare: along public roads, railway lines, undeveloped plots, road verges, and the banks of ditches. The land is mostly used for maize, groundnuts, sweet potatoes, green vegetables, fruits, paprika, and flowers. This unsanctioned cultivation has a history of necessity: in colonial times, laborers wanted towns where they could cultivate crops like at their rural homes, and with very low income, needed to supplement their food supply.

However, urban agriculture in Harare causes harm to the environment. The practice has reduced rainwater infiltration into the soil by 28.5% and lowered tree species diversity. In addition, most informal urban farmers use harmful chemical fertilizers. Urban agriculture has also been viewed negatively in Harare because it impedes on housing and urban development. In the eyes of Zimbabwean laws, agriculture was not an "urban" activity or a legitimate form of land use in cities. In 1983, the Greater Harare Illegal Cultivation Committee was formed, though its efforts to curb urban agriculture wholly failed.

In the 1990s, the failure of Structural Adjustment Programs induced greater unemployment, higher prices, and lower incomes, so more people started growing their own food. Between 1990 and 1994, Harare's cultivation area increased by 92.6%. The boom in urban agriculture improved both the food security and the nutrition of its practitioners, as well as additional income from selling excess produce. The practice continued in the 2000s when a major recession brought about widespread poverty, unemployment, and enormous inflation. Finally, the 2002 Nyanga Declaration on Urban Agriculture in Zimbabwe explicitly acknowledged the value of urban agriculture for food security and the reduction of poverty. Accepting that many people depend on it to survive, the government allocated sixty thousand hectares of land in Harare for cultivation purposes.

Benefits
The benefits that UPA brings along to cities that implement this practice are numerous. The transformation of cities from only consumers of food to generators of agricultural products contributes to sustainability, improved health, and poverty alleviation.

 UPA assists to close the open-loop system in urban areas characterized by the importation of food from rural zones and the exportation of waste to regions outside the city or town.
 Wastewater and organic solid waste can be transformed into resources for growing agriculture products: the former can be used for irrigation, the latter as fertilizer.
 Vacant urban areas can be used for agriculture production.
 Other natural resources can be conserved. The use of wastewater for irrigation improves water management and increases the availability of fresh water for drinking and household consumption.
 UPA can help to preserve bioregional ecologies from being transformed into cropland.
 Urban agriculture saves energy (e.g. energy consumed in transporting food from rural to urban areas).
 Local production of food also allows savings in transportation costs, storage, and in product loss, what results in food cost reduction.
 UPA improves the quality of the urban environment through greening and thus, a reduction in pollution.
 Urban agriculture also makes the city a healthier place to live by improving the quality of the environment.
 UPA is a very effective tool to fight against hunger and malnutrition since it facilitates the access to food by an impoverished sector of the urban population.
Poverty alleviation: It is known that a large part of the people involved in urban agriculture is the urban poor. In developing countries, the majority of urban agricultural production is for self-consumption, with surpluses being sold in the market. According to the FAO (Food and Agriculture Organization of the United Nations), urban poor consumers spend 60–80% of their income on food, making them very vulnerable to higher food prices.
 UPA provides food and creates savings in household expenditure on consumables, thus increasing the amount of income allocated to other uses.
 UPA surpluses can be sold in local markets, generating more income for the urban poor.

Community centers and gardens educate the community to see agriculture as an integral part of urban life. The Florida House Institute for Sustainable Development in Sarasota, Florida, serves as a public community and education center in which innovators with sustainable, energy-saving ideas can implement and test them. Community centers like Florida House provide urban areas with a central location to learn about urban agriculture and to begin to integrate agriculture with the urban lifestyle.

Urban farms also are a proven effective educational tool to teach kids about healthy eating and meaningful physical activity.

Trade-offs
 Space is at a premium in cities and is accordingly expensive and difficult to secure.
 The utilization of untreated wastewater for urban agricultural irrigation can facilitate the spread of waterborne diseases among the human population. 
 Although studies have demonstrated improved air quality in urban areas related to the proliferation of urban gardens, it has also been shown that increasing urban pollution (related specifically to a sharp rise in the number of automobiles on the road), has led to an increase in insect pests, which consume plants produced by urban agriculture. It is believed that changes to the physical structure of the plants themselves, which have been correlated to increased levels of air pollution, increase plants' palatability to insect pests. Reduced yields within urban gardens decreases the amount of food available for human consumption. 
 Studies indicate that the nutritional quality of wheat suffers when urban wheat plants are exposed to high nitrogen dioxide and sulfur dioxide concentrations. This problem is particularly acute in the developing world, where outdoor concentrations of sulfur dioxide are high and large percentages of the population rely upon urban agriculture as a primary source of food. These studies have implications for the nutritional quality of other staple crops that are grown in urban settings.
 Agricultural activities on land that is contaminated (with such metals as lead) pose potential risks to human health. These risks are associated both with working directly on contaminated land and with consuming food that was grown in contaminated soil.

Municipal greening policy goals can pose conflicts. For example, policies promoting urban tree canopy are not sympathetic to vegetable gardening because of the deep shade cast by trees. However, some municipalities like Portland, Oregon, and Davenport, Iowa are encouraging the implementation of fruit-bearing trees (as street trees or as park orchards) to meet both greening and food production goals.

See also

 Allotment (gardening)
 Asset-based community development
 Building-integrated agriculture
 Ecological sanitation
 Foodscaping
 Forest gardening
 Green wall
 Growbag
 Growroom
 Guerrilla gardening
 Market garden
 Metropolitan agriculture
 Permaculture
 Rooftop gardens
 Satoyama
 Sheet mulching
 Smallholding
 Subsistence agriculture
 Terraces (agriculture)
 Underground farming
 Urban horticulture
 Urban forestry
 Vertical farming
 Windowfarm

References

Notes
 
 Farming Goes Vertical
 Skyfarming (2 April 2007). New York Magazine.
 City Farm Grows Jobs, Knowledge, and Tomatoes, article about Chicago's City Farm

Further reading

External links

 Federation of City Farms & Community Gardens
 European Federation of City Farms
 FAO programs
 Water, Land, and Health of Urban and Peri-Urban food production
 Turning Shipping Containers Into Urban Farms
Built-Up Encroachment and the Urban Field: A Comparison of Forty European Cities.

 
Sustainable food system